Donato Felice d'Allio (October 24, 1677 – May 6, 1761) was an Italian architect of the Baroque who worked in Austria.

He was commissioned by Charles VI to redesign the Klosterneuburg Monastery, but the work was never finished. Donato Felice d'Allio began an apprenticeship as a mason in his native country around 1690. Around 1698 he came to Vienna as a journeyman, where he later worked as a foreman and then as a master mason. From 1711 to 1747 he was employed by the Military Construction Office, where he prepared reports and expert opinions, for example on the military permissibility of civilian buildings.

He was born at Scaria, near Como, and died at Vienna.

References

1677 births
1761 deaths
18th-century Austrian architects
18th-century Italian architects
Architects from Lombardy
Italian emigrants to Austria
People from the Province of Como